The 1996–97 Ukrainian Amateur Cup  was the inaugural annual season of Ukraine's football knockout competition for amateur football teams. The competition started on 29 September 1996 and concluded on 8 June 1997.

This was the first season since similar competition for teams of physical culture (KFK) that was conducted in the Soviet Ukraine in 1959 – 1989.

Teams

Competition schedule

First qualification round

Notes:
 Byes: Druzhba-Elevator Mahdalynivka, Probiy Horodenka, Dynamo Manevychi, Hidroliznyk Olshanske, Monolit Illichivsk, Silur-Trubnyk Khartsyzk, Burevisnyk-Elbrus Kirovohrad

Second qualification round

|}
Notes:
 Byes: Druzhba-Elevator Mahdalynivka, Domobudivnyk Chernihiv, Krystal Parkhomivka

Quarterfinals (1/4)

|}

Semifinals (1/2)

|}

Final

|}

Final standings

See also
 1996–97 Ukrainian Football Amateur League

External links
 1996–97 Ukrainian Amateur Cup at the Footpass (Football Federation of Ukraine)

Ukrainian Amateur Cup
Ukrainian Amateur Cup
Amateur Cup